John Edward "Jack" Stoddard (September 26, 1926 – January 29, 2014) was born in Stoney Creek, Ontario and was a professional ice hockey player who played 80 games in the National Hockey League. He played with the New York Rangers. Stoddard died in Owen Sound in 2014.

Playing career
Initially, he played junior in the OHA between 1943 and 1946. In addition to the Rangers, he also played for other teams such as the Baltimore Clippers, the Providence Reds, and the Quebec Aces.

When traded to the Rangers in January 1952 for Pat Egan, Zellio Toppazzini and Jean Paul Denis, he was leading the AHL with 48 points in 34 games. 
He was the NHL's tallest player in the 1951–1952 and 1952–1953 seasons and was the first Rangers player to wear the number 13.

References

External links

1926 births
2014 deaths
Baltimore Clippers (1945–49) players
Canadian ice hockey right wingers
Ice hockey people from Ontario
New York Rangers players
Sportspeople from Hamilton, Ontario